Melittacanthus is a genus of flowering plants belonging to the family Acanthaceae.

Its native range is Madagascar.

Species
Species:
 Melittacanthus divaricatus S.Moore

References

Acanthaceae
Acanthaceae genera